Jeevana Jyothi (Telugu: జీవన జ్యోతి) is a 1975 Telugu film directed by K. Viswanath.  It stars Vanisri in a double role as mother and daughter. Sobhan Babu is the leading man. This film won major awards especially in Filmfare Awards South and also won two Nandi Awards. The director K. Viswanath later remade the film in Hindi as Sanjog (1985), with Jaya Prada and Jeetendra. The film was also remade in Kannada as Balina Jyothi, with Vishnu Vardhan. The film was screened at the Asian and African film Festival at Tashkent.

Plot
Hyderabad-bred Vasu goes to a village, where he meets and falls in love with a village belle, Lakshmi. She also is attracted to him, and both get married. After their marriage, both go to live with Vasu's parents, brother Panduranga Rao, sister-in-law, Janaki, and her son, Sonu. Lakshmi gets close to Sonu, and starts to spend all her time with him. This raises some concerns with Janaki, which results in some acrimony. Tragically, Sonu dies, leaving Lakshmi devastated and depressed. She gets pregnant and gives birth to a baby girl, but cannot get Sonu out of her mind. Her depression gives way to insanity, as she keeps on seeing Sonu in every child, and as a result she is institutionalized. Vasu has taken to alcohol in a big way and drowns his sorrows and frustrations day and night in a drunken stupor. As a result, his daughter is adopted by Janaki and his brother, without knowing who her real parents are. Years pass by, their daughter, Sobha, has grown up and is herself a mother of a baby boy, and is going to settled in the US. Before leaving, the entire family assembles to visit Lakshmi. They find her holding a piece of log, covered in a blanket, singing to it as if it where Sonu. It is here that Sobha finds out who her real parents are, and it is here that she will be called upon to make the ultimate sacrifice.

Cast
 Shobhan Babu as Vasu
 Vanisree as Lakshmi/Sobha
 Kaikala Satyanarayana as Vasu's brother, Pandurangarao
 Raja Babu as Vasu's friend, Raju
 Ramaprabha as Raju's wife
 Shubha as Vasu's Sister-in-Law, Janaki
 Allu Rama Lingaiah as Vasu's father
 Nirmalamma as Vasu's mother
 Amol Palekar

Songs 
"Ekkada Ekkada Dakkunnano Cheppuko" - 
"Endukante Emi Cheppanu" -
"Muddula Maa Baabu" -
"Sinni O Sinni" -

Awards 
Filmfare Awards South
Best Film - Telugu - D. V. S. Raju
Best Director - Telugu - K. Viswanath
Best Actor - Telugu - Shoban Babu
Best Actress - Telugu - Vanisri

Nandi Awards - 1975
Best Feature Film - Gold - D. V. S. Raju
Best Story Writer - K. Rama Lakshmi

Box office
The film ran for more than 100 days in 12 centres.

References

External links
 Jeevana Jyoti film at IMDb.

Indian drama films
1975 films
Films directed by K. Viswanath
Telugu films remade in other languages
Films scored by K. V. Mahadevan
1970s Telugu-language films
1975 drama films